The Samsung Galaxy A7 (2016) or Samsung Galaxy A7 2016 Edition is an Android smartphone produced by Samsung Electronics. It was introduced on December 2, 2015, along with Samsung Galaxy A3 (2016), Samsung Galaxy A5 (2016), and Samsung Galaxy A9 (2016)

The Samsung Galaxy A7 (2016) runs Android 5.1.1 Lollipop right out-of-the-box and is upgradeable to Android 6.0.1 Marshmallow and Android 7.0 Nougat. The smartphone features Exynos 7580 SoC consisting of octa-core 1.6 Ghz ARM Cortex-A53 processor and Mali T720-MP2 GPU and sports 3 GB RAM and 16 GB internal storage which expandable up to 128 GB via a MicroSD slot which can also be used for a second Nano-SIM. In China, it was released with Snapdragon 615. The device retains a non-removable battery like its predecessor, rated at 3300 mAh.

Samsung Galaxy A7 (2017) is the successor of Samsung Galaxy A7 (2016).

Availability
The Samsung Galaxy A7 (2016) was released in China on December 15, 2015, followed by other countries in the Q1 2016. As of April 2016, the Samsung Galaxy A7 (2016) is now available in Eastern Europe (only Russia, Ukraine and Turkey), Africa, Middle East, Latin America and Asia. It is not available in North America and rest of Europe.

While its predecessor Samsung Galaxy A7 (2015) had broader availability in Europe, this model was never sold in Europe because it was deemed too expensive and also near-direct competitor against Samsung Galaxy S6.

Variants

References

Android (operating system) devices
Samsung Galaxy
Samsung smartphones
Mobile phones introduced in 2015
Discontinued smartphones